The discography of Carlos Vives, a Colombian musician, consists of thirteen studio albums, thirty singles and music videos.

Studio albums

Singles

As lead artist

Promotional singles

Other charted songs

Notes

A.  "Fruta Fresca" did not enter the Billboard Hot 100, but peaked at number 9 on the Bubbling Under Hot 100 Singles chart, which acts as a 25-song extension to the Hot 100.
B.  "Déjame Entrar" did not enter the Billboard Hot 100, but peaked at number 7 on the Bubbling Under Hot 100 Singles chart, which acts as a 25-song extension to the Hot 100.
C.  "Luna Nueva" did not enter the Billboard Hot 100, but peaked at number 14 on the Bubbling Under Hot 100 Singles chart, which acts as a 25-song extension to the Hot 100.
D.  "Como Tú" did not enter the Billboard Hot 100, but peaked at number 7 on the Bubbling Under Hot 100 Singles chart, which acts as a 25-song extension to the Hot 100.

References 
General
 
 

Specific

Discographies of Colombian artists
Latin pop music discographies
Tropical music discographies